The Ancient Emii was an autonomous community in Imo State in south eastern Nigeria having the postal code 460111. It is near the city of Owerri. The ancient Emii town was made up of ten villages; but due to developmental needs and political reasons the ancient town of Emii has now been divided into three autonomous communities: Mbaoma, Ezimba and  Emii central community. Mbaoma autonomous community comprises Ubaa (also spelt as Ubah), Umuawuka and Emohe. The people of the ancient Emii which now make up the three respective autonomous communities, are Igbo, and speak the Igbo language of the Owerri dialect. They are "ndi Owere" (Owerri people). The three autonomous communities form part of the Owerri Capital Territory of Imo State. At the end of every year, the cultural festival Okazi Akirioche Festival is celebrated.

References

Towns in Imo State